Mas Flow Incorporated is a record label founded by Luny Tunes, a Dominican reggaeton production duo. It claims to be among the companies that helped expand the reggaeton genre beyond its limits. Mas Flow has many connections to the East Coast; in fact most of their producing teams come from Massachusetts in the US. Its primary headquarters is in Carolina, Puerto Rico. It has a regional office in New Jersey and Boston, Massachusetts and Rochester, New York.

For their album Mas Flow 3, announced in 2015, they produced the single «Mayor que yo 3», which brought together Wisin & Yandel, Don Omar and Daddy Yankee for the first time.

Roster

Producers
 Luny Tunes
 Tainy
 Nely "El Arma Secreta"
 Nesty "La Mente Maestra"
 Bones
 Thilo
 Miki "La Mano Bionica"
 Doble A & Nales
 DJ Coffee
 Underage
 Naldo
Handyman

Artists
 Ashanti Baeza
 Dyland & Lenny
 El Roockie
 Yo-Seph
 Emmanuel Vélez
Ektor

Affiliated artists
Artists who are affiliated with this label include:
 Daddy Yankee
 Wisin & Yandel
 Don Omar
 Ivy Queen
 De La Ghetto
 Arcángel
 Plan B

Affiliated producers
 Ashanti Baeza
Nely "El Arma Secreta"
Naldo

Albums released by Mas Flow Inc.
2003
Mas Flow

2004
The Kings of the Beats
La Trayectoria
Luny Tunes Presents: La Mision 4: The Take Over

2005
Mas Flow 2

2006
Reggaeton Hits
Mas Flow 2.5 
Mas Flow: Los Benjamins 
The Kings of the Beats 2

2007
Los Benjamins: La Continuación 

2008

Semblante Urbano
Luny Tunes Presents: Erre XI
El Fenómeno

In The Future
Mas Flow 3

References

See also
List of record labels
Universal Music Group
Machete Music
Luny Tunes production discography
Noriega production discography
 

Puerto Rican record labels
American record labels
Record labels established in 2005
Reggaeton record labels